Vadas is a surname. Notable people with the surname include:

Albert Vadas (1876–1946), United States Navy sailor
Kenny Vadas (born 1981), Canadian actor
József Vadas (1911–2006), Hungarian former sprinter
Miklós Vadas (1906–1981), Hungarian footballer and coach

See also
Vada (disambiguation)